John O'Neill  (born 13 July 1990) is an Irish sportsperson.  He plays hurling with his local club Clonoulty–Rossmore and with the Kerry senior inter-county team.

Career
In 2007 O'Neill was a member of the Tipperary minor team that won the Munster Minor final by 0-18 to 1-11 against Cork. Tipperary subsequently defeated Kilkenny to qualify for the All-Ireland final. Cork, the defeated Munster finalists, provided the opposition and a high-scoring game developed over the course of the hour.  At the full-time whistle Tipperary were the champions by 3-14 to 2-11.

On 28 July 2010, O'Neill was a non-playing substitute as Tipperary defeated Clare in the 2010 Munster Under-21 Hurling final at Semple Stadium, winning by 1–22 to 1–17.
On 11 September 2010, he came on as a substitute as Tipperary clinched the All Ireland Under-21 title by defeating Galway by 5–22 to 0–12 at Semple Stadium.

He made his senior Tipperary debut in the first round of the league on 12 February 2011 against Kilkenny, scoring a point in a 1-10 to 1-17 defeat at Semple Stadium. In his second game against Dublin at Croke Park a week later he scored a goal and two points.

Honours

Tipperary 
All-Ireland Under-21 Hurling Championship:
Winner (1): 2010
Munster Under-21 Hurling Championship:
Winner (1): 2010
All-Ireland Minor Hurling Championship:
Winner (1): 2007
Munster Minor Hurling Championship:
Winner (1): 2007

References

External links
 Tipperary GAA Player Profiles

1990 births
Living people
Tipperary hurlers
Clonoulty-Rossmore hurlers